Gleison may refer to:

 Gleison (footballer, born 1984), full name Gleison Rezende Vilela, Brazilian football striker
 Gleison (footballer, born 1995), full name Gleison Wilson da Silva Moreira, Brazilian football forward
 Gleison Bremer (born 1997), Brazilian football centre-back
 Gleison Santos (born 1981), Brazilian football defender
 Gleison Tibau (born 1983), Brazilian mixed martial artist

See also
 Gleason (disambiguation)
 Gleidson (disambiguation)